Zeiler is a German surname. Notable people with the surname include:

Arthur Zeiler (born 1988), German rugby union player
Gail Zeiler (1950–2016), American singer known professionally as Kacey Jones
Gerhard Zeiler (born 1955), president of Turner International
John Zeiler (born 1982), American ice hockey player
Martin Zeiler (1589–1661), German writer
Peter Zeiler (born 1970), German footballer

German-language surnames